Chaos in Bloom is the thirteenth studio album by American rock band the Goo Goo Dolls. It was released on August 12, 2022 by Warner Records.

Recording and release
In an interview with Kyle Meredith of Consequence in June 2021, band member John Rzeznik confirmed that work was underway for the band's then-untitled fourteenth studio album. He also revealed that the band decided to write and record the material in a "more raw" fashion. In another interview with Spin, Rzeznik revealed that he produced most of the album himself.

The album's first single "Yeah, I Like You" was released on July 1, 2022. The second single, "You Are the Answer", was released on July 29, 2022.

Critical reception

Writing for AllMusic, Stephen Thomas Erlewine rated the album three-and-a-half stars out of five, and wrote: "Occasionally, [Chaos in Bloom] drifts into reflective territory that betrays its pandemic creation, but where most lockdown albums linger in slow, quiet territory, Goo Goo Dolls ultimately rally with melodic, fist-pumping rock intended to empower as much as entertain. If, apart from the occasional slick synthesized gloss, Chaos in Bloom doesn't sound markedly different than other Goo Goo Dolls albums, give the band — and especially producer [John] Rzeznik — credit for this: over 30 years into their career, they know what works for them and what doesn't, so they showcase their attributes to their best effect on this tight, lean record."

Track listing

Personnel
Goo Goo Dolls
 John Rzeznik – lead vocals (tracks 1–4, 6-7, 9-10); guitar, production (all tracks)
 Robby Takac – bass (all tracks), lead vocals (5, 8)

Additional musicians
 Craig Macintyre – drums (all tracks), piano (9)
 Jamie Muhoberac – keyboards
 Billy Perez – keyboards (1–8, 10)
 Luis Conte – percussion (1, 2, 5–8, 10)
 Brad Fernquist – guitar (2, 3, 5, 6, 8, 10)
 Genevieve Schatz – vocals (3), backing vocals (4, 9)
 Grace Enger – backing vocals (3)
 John Button – bass (3)
 Chris Szczech – guitar (4, 8, 10)
 Jim McGorman – backing vocals (5, 8)
 Will Scott – drums (7)
 Jason Soda – guitar (9)
 Cindy Cashdollar – steel guitar (10)

Technical
 Brad Fernquist – production
 Gregg Wattenberg – production (1, 2, 6, 7, 9, 10)
 Chris Szczech – additional production, engineering
 Emily Lazar – mastering
 Chris Allgood – mastering
 Mark Endert – mixing (1, 2, 9)
 Joe Zook – mixing (3–8, 10)
 Brad Lauchert – additional engineering (3, 5, 7, 8)
 Ken Hemlinger – engineering assistance (1, 2, 4–8, 10)
 Kody Reiners – engineering assistance (3, 4, 6, 7, 9)

Charts

References

2022 albums
Goo Goo Dolls albums
Warner Records albums
Albums produced by Brad Fernquist
Albums produced by Gregg Wattenberg